Dorothy Helen Cornish (1 October 1870 – 7 October 1945) was an English Montessori educator, suffragist, translator, writer and editor of the feminist gender studies journal Urania.

Biography 
Cornish was born in Sixhills, Lincolnshire on 1 October 1870. Her father was Rev. Frank Fortescue Cornish, who was H.M. Inspector of Schools. She moved with her family to Manchester at the age of six for her father's work.

Cornish worked as a Montessori educator and acted as interpreter for Maria Montessori for many of her English courses.

Cornish was a member of the Aëthnic Union, along with Eva Gore-Booth, Esther Roper, Thomas Baty and Jessey Wade. In 1916, they co-founded the feminist journal Urania and she contributed as editor. Cornish opposed children being indoctrinated into gender roles. She moved to Siena in around 1895 and spent most of her life in Italy, where she continued her work as co-editor of Urania.

In 1914, she signed the Open Christmas Letter along with 100 other suffragists, including Gore-Booth and Roper.

Cornish was a member of the Brontë Society, and in 1940, she published a novel about the Brontë sisters; she also translated two French essays by Emily Brontë.

Cornish died in Sidmouth, Devon, on 7 October 1945.

Bibliography 

 Verses (San Bernardino: Pontifical Printing-Office, 1904)
 Sealed Poetry by Robert Burns (editor and translator; Firenze: Landi, 1908)
 These Were the Brontes: A Novel (New York: Macmillan Co., 1940)

References 

1870 births
1945 deaths
20th-century English women writers
English feminist writers
English suffragists
English translators
Montessori teachers
People from West Lindsey District
Women of the Victorian era